Cat Palmer (born in Orange County, California) is an American queer photographer and artist best known for images of women.

Biography
Palmer was born, in 1980, and raised in Orange County, California, by her paternal grandparents, Ray & Lois Van De Warker. Cat started photographing people on the streets of Los Angeles and that is where she met punks Spoon & Squid, who were later a part of Decline of The Western Civilization series. She graduated from Villa Park High School in 1997, and studied photography at Orange Coast College.

She was married to artist, Blake Palmer from 1998-2013. Cat was a closeted gay Mormon and later left the LDS church and her marriage. She has two children with Blake.

She relocated to northern Utah in 2001. In 2004, she met her mentor Al Thelin and when deciding on whether to return to college and finish her degree he told her school could not teach her how to have an eye and to invest in equipment and to just keep shooting.

Cat went on to lecture at most of the Universities and win many awards. She has been published in every publication and exhibited in just about every gallery in the Salt Lake Valley. Cat was the Director of The Urban Arts Gallery and helped open it and ran it for 18 months before resigning. Cat has an ongoing monthly segment on ABC 4 Good Things Utah. 

Cartoonist Pat Bagley married Cat to Dr. M M Dillon in a secret ceremony in April 2022.

She currently has a studio in Salt Lake City, Utah, where she displays her art and works commercial photography.

Career
Cat made a full-time go of her photography and art in 2009. She has been shooting since 1995 and professionally since 2004. In 2022, she retired from shooting weddings but still focuses on headshots and portraits of people. She photographed SLC Mayor Jackie Biskupski's wedding to her wife, Betty. Cat was Jackie's personal photograph for many years. Many recognize Cat's Last Supper piece with the 12 bad asses of SLC. 

Cat has tackled many political issues in her art including transgender visibility, gay marriage, defying beauty standards in women, body autonomy/ reproductive rights, "GO HOME Trump", Black Lives Matter, and a few other feminist issues.

Black-and-white photography features strongly in her work, sometimes printed onto metal or wood with Xerox transfer words and spray pint mixed media.

Recognition
In 2008 the Salt Lake City Weekly called Palmer's work "striking", and wrote that she was "one of the rising stars of the local art scene's work". They also noted that she is "active in the community, teaching classes and serving on the board of the Women's Art Center."

Awards and nominations
Invited Artist for The Utah Arts Festival 2007

Best Photographer • 2007 • Artys City Weekly

Best Photographer • 2008 • Artys City Weekly

Best in Show for 2-D Mixed Media, at Utah Arts Festival 2009

Best Photographer • 2011 • Artys City Weekly

Best Photographer • 2016 • Fabby Award From QSalt Lake Magazine

Best Visual Artist • 2016 • Fabby Award From QSalt Lake Magazine

Best Feminist • 2016 • Salt Lake City Weekly Best of Issue 

Best Visual Artist • 2017 • Fabby Award from Q Salt Lake Magazine

Best Visual Artist • 2017 • Best of Sat Lake City Weekly

Best Visual Artist • 2018 • Best of Salt Lake City Weekly

Best Visual Artist • 2019 • Best of Salt Lake City Weekly

Best Visual Artist • 2021 • Best of Salt Lake City Weekly

Exhibits

Cat has exhibited many places since 2011 including the 300 plates show for Art Access, The Urban Arts Gallery, Sugar House Art Stroll, Springville Museum and a variety of other places. 
 2015 zest (currently exhibiting) 
 2011 Tin Angel, March solo exhibit, Salt Lake City
 2011 Art Space, January, Salt Lake City
 2010 The Hive Gallery, ‘Age of Aesthetics’ Solo Exhibit, November, Salt Lake City
 2010 Utah Art Alliance, ‘Some where over the rainbow’, October, Salt Lake City
 2010 Gallery UAF, February, Visual Dialogues, group exhibit
 2009 Art Access, ‘Spousal Collaboration’, June, Salt Lake City
 2009 Kayo Gallery, ‘Inner Beauty’, February, Salt Lake City
 2008 Iao Gallery, Heavy Metal, October, Salt Lake City
 2008 YWCA, Stop Domestic Violence, November, Salt Lake City
 2008 Mestizo Gallery •Utah Artists Against Domestic Violence, September, Salt Lake City
 2008 North Ogden Arts Festival, August
 2008 Addicted Café, July–September, Salt Lake City
 2008 (a) pertue, Summertime Soiree, July, Salt Lake City
 2008 Utah Arts Festival, June, Salt Lake City
 2008 Art Access, ‘300 plates’, May, Salt Lake City
 2008 Ken Sanders Rare Books, ‘Blood, Fertility, Magic’, May, Salt Lake City
 2008 UCASA, April, Salt Lake City 
 2008 Poor Yorick, Invited Artist, March, Salt Lake City
 2008 University of Utah, ‘Political is Personal’, March, Salt Lake City
 2008 Kayo Gallery, ‘A tribute to battered women’, February, Salt Lake City
 2008 The Women's Art Center, ‘Fusion’, February, Salt Lake City 2008
 2007 Tin Angel, Salt Lake City
 2007 Poor Yorick, Invited Artist, Salt Lake City
 2007 Slow Train, Salt Lake City
 2007 Women's Art Center, ‘Progression’, Salt Lake City
 2007 Utah Arts Festival Gallery, ‘Imagine’, Salt Lake City
 2007 Caffe Niche, Salt Lake City
 2007 Utah Arts Festival, June, Invited Artist
 2007 Broadway Theater, Salt Lake City
 2006 Poor Yorick, Invited Artist, Salt Lake City
 2006 Cisco 13, Salt Lake City
 2006 Broken Records, Salt Lake City
 2006 Coffee Break, Salt Lake City
 2005 The Unknown Gallery, Salt Lake City
 2005 Nouveaux Alt, Salt Lake City
 2005 Stoneground, Salt Lake City 
 2004 Cup of Joe, Salt Lake City

Publications and articles
2022, Human Stories Podcast, Episode 106 

2021, Why Cat Palmer Inspires Us To Be Brave, Got Beauty

2019, Smog Lake City, City Weekly, Scott Renshaw

2018, The New Utah Podcast

2017, The Hill, Protestors spell out "Go Home Trump"

2017, Democracy Now!, Thousands Protest

2017, Salt Lake Tribune, Protestors "Go Home Trump"

2017, OZY mini doc

2016, Episode 210, I Am Salt Lake Podcast (live)

2016, City Weekly, Q&A with art activist Cat Palmer, by Andrea Harvey

2016, SLUG magazine, Stranger No More, by Mariah Mann Mellus 

2016, The Utah Daily Chronicle, Cat Got Your Tongue, Julie Hirschi

2016, Episode 9, Your Cr8tivity podcast

2015, Episode 177, I am Salt Lake Podcast

2015, Utah photographer sets table for edgier take on Last Supper, by Sean Means, Salt Lake Tribune

2015, Let’s Go Eat Podcast with Bill Allred

2015, Episode 189 The Last Supper, I am Salt Lake Podcast

2015, Tightrope to the Sun Blog, Be Prolific, Emma J Phelps

2015, The Salt Life, Empowering Women Through Art by Deena Marie

2014, A Star Wars Art Exhibit for May the Fourth, by Sean Means

2013, Cat Palmer has hundreds of secrets, by Paul Duane

2013, Nomad Nouvelle, by Mandy

2012, Salt Lake Tribune, by Sean Means

2012, 15 Bytes, by Shawn Rossiter

2012, Finding Empowerment with Cat Palmer 

2012, City Weekly, You Don't Own ME, Bill Frost

2012, Salt Lake Magazine Blog, The Utah Arts Festival 
 2010, SLUG magazine, Gallery Stroll, by Mariah Mellus
 2010, The Salt Lake Tribune, A bold look at bald, by Daisy Blake
 20101, Salt Lake City Weekly, Cat Palmer: Age of Aesthetics by Brian Staker
 2010, ABC4, Interview for age of aesthetic shoot
 2010, Fox 13 News, Interview for age of aesthetic shoot
 2010, KUTV News, Interview for age of aesthetic shoot
 2010, In This Week, Arts: Cat Palmer's Close Shave, by Daisy Blake
 2009, The Rock Salt, Interview with KUTV, by Gavin Sheenan
 2009, In This Week, Cover Story, Artist Profile, by Ryan Michael Painter
 2009, Salt Lake City Weekly, Synergetics, by Brian Staker
 2008, Women's Week 2008 Political is Personal: Activism Embodied
 2008, Salt Lake Magazine, Words to live by
 2008, Salt Lake City Weekly, Photography
 2008, The Daily Chronicle, Women's Week: Camera critiques social issues
 2007, The Salt Lake Tribune, To Hell & Back
 2007, The Daily Chronicle, Art as Activism
 2007, City Weekly, Gavin's Underground; Cat Palmer
 2007, Deseret Morning News
 2007, Catalyst
 2007, Standard Examiner, The Human Factor
 2007, Standard Examiner, Go!, Flashes of beauty…power…grace
 2007, SLUG
 2007, Park City TV

References

External links
 
 Cat Palmer's Official Blog
 Poor Yorick Studios, Salt Lake City, Utah
 YouTube; "Age Of Aesthetics" by Cat Palmer, part 1
 YouTube; "Age Of Aesthetics" by Cat Palmer, part 2

Artists from Utah
American photographers
University of Utah alumni
Orange Coast College alumni
1980s births
Living people
American women photographers
21st-century American women